The Voice : La plus belle voix is a reality singing competition on TF1. It is France's version of The Voice format created by John de Mol. The first episode was aired on 25 February 2012. It is the second time that the format has been produced in French after the Belgian version The Voice Belgique.

One of the important premises of the show is the quality of the singing talent. Four coaches, themselves popular performing artists, train the talents on their team and occasionally perform with them. Talents are selected in blind auditions, where the coaches cannot see, but only hear the auditioning contestant.

Format 

The series consists of three phases: a blind audition, a battle phase, and live performance shows. Four judges/coaches, all noteworthy recording artists, choose teams of contestants through a blind audition process. Each judge has the length of the auditioner's performance (about one minute) to decide if he or she wants that singer on his or her team; if two or more judges want the same singer (as happens frequently), the singer has the final choice of coach.
Another twist is brought to the show, the block. Beside the big red button, each coaches have 3 other buttons which have the name of other coach. If the coach want an artist but doesn't want a rival coaches to get that artist, they can hit the button with the name of the coach that they want to block, it will automatically blocks that other coaches and spin the chair. If the blocked coach choose to turn around, their entire chair lighting will stay red, the "JE VOUS VEUX" text below the chair will not appear and the LED screen toward them will say "BLOQUE" instead, not the coaches name. In season 12, can block another coach at any time, even during their pitch. When a coach is blocked, his/her chair turns back. 

Each team of singers is mentored and developed by its respective coach. In the second stage, called the battle phase, coaches have two of their team members battle against each other directly by singing the same song together, with the coach choosing which team member to advance from each of four individual "battles" into the first live round. Within that first live round, the surviving acts from each team again compete head-to-head, with a combination of public and jury vote deciding who advances onto the next round.
In the final phase, the remaining contestants (top 8) compete against each other in live broadcasts. The television audience and the coaches have equal say 50/50 in deciding who moves on to the final 4 phase. With one team member remaining for each coach, the final 4 contestants compete against each other in the finale with the outcome decided solely by public vote.

Development, production and marketing 

In late 2011 French production company Shine France bought the format and the large national television chains, including TF1 and M6, expressed interest. TF1 eventually won the contract and the format was aired in 2012 as a replacement to the long running Star Academy series.

Winners and Winning Coaches 
 The first season was won by Stéphan Rizon, a contestant on team Florent.
 The second season was won by Yoann Fréget, a contestant on team Garou.
 The third season was won by Kendji Girac, a contestant on team Mika.
 The fourth season was won by Lilian Renaud, a contestant on team Zazie.
 The fifth season was won by Slimane Nebchi, a contestant on team Florent.
 The sixth season was won by Lisandro Cuxi, a contestant on team Matt.
 The seventh season was won by Maëlle Pistoia, a contestant on team Zazie.
 The eighth season was won by Whitney Marin, a contestant on team Mika.
 The ninth season was won by Abi Bernadoth, a contestant on team Pascal.
 The tenth season was won by Marghe Davico, a contestant on team Florent.
 The eleventh season was won by Nour Brousse, a contestant on team Florent.

Coaches and hosts

Coaches

Hosts

Series overview 
Warning: the following table presents a significant amount of different colors.

The Voice All-Stars 
For the first-decade anniversary special of The Voice France, and for the first time in the history of The Voice, there will be 5 coaches for 5 individual seats under the first All-Stars version, where contestants from previous seasons will participate.

Coaches' teams and finalists 
  Winner
  Runner-up
  Third place
  Fourth place
  Fifth place/Eliminated

 Winners are in bold, finalists in the finale are listed first, stolen artists are in italicized font, and eliminated artists are in small font.

References

2012 French television series debuts
French reality television series
French television series based on non-French television series
Television productions suspended due to the COVID-19 pandemic